Lola is a genus of harvestmen belonging to the family Phalangodidae.

Species:

Lola insularis 
Lola konavoka

References

Harvestmen